Román Mayorga Quirós was a Salvadoran politician who was a member of the Central American University and a member of the Revolutionary Government Junta of El Salvador from 1979 to 1980.

References 

People from San Salvador
Salvadoran politicians
People of the Salvadoran Civil War